is a Japanese footballer who plays for Tokushima Vortis.

Club statistics
Updated to 22 February 2020.

References

External links

Profile at Mito HollyHock

1995 births
Living people
Association football people from Chiba Prefecture
Japanese footballers
J2 League players
J3 League players
Mito HollyHock players
J.League U-22 Selection players
Fagiano Okayama players
Association football midfielders